Nelson Wilmarth Aldrich (/ˈɑldɹɪt͡ʃ/; November 6, 1841 – April 16, 1915) was a prominent American politician and a leader of the Republican Party in the United States Senate, where he represented Rhode Island from 1881 to 1911. By the 1890s, he was one of the "Big Four" key Republicans who largely controlled the major decisions of the Senate, along with Orville H. Platt, William B. Allison, and John Coit Spooner. Because of his impact on national politics and central position on the pivotal Senate Finance Committee, he was referred to by the press and public alike as the "general manager of the Nation", dominating tariff and monetary policy in the first decade of the 20th century.

Born in Foster, Rhode Island, Aldrich served in the Union Army during the American Civil War. After the war, he became a partner in a large wholesale grocery firm and won election to the Rhode Island House of Representatives. He served a single term in the United States House of Representatives before winning election to the Senate. In the Senate, he helped to create an extensive system of tariffs that protected American factories and farms from foreign competition, and he was a cosponsor of the Payne–Aldrich Tariff Act. He also helped win Senate approval of the 1898 Treaty of Paris, which ended the Spanish–American War.

Aldrich led the passage of the Aldrich–Vreeland Act, which established the National Monetary Commission to study the causes of the Panic of 1907. He served as chair of that commission, which drew up the Aldrich Plan as a basis for a reform of the financial regulatory system. The Aldrich Plan strongly influenced the Federal Reserve Act of 1913, which established the Federal Reserve System. Aldrich also sponsored the Sixteenth Amendment, which allowed for a direct federal income tax.

Deeply committed to the efficiency model of the Progressive Era, he believed that his financial and trade policies would lead to greater efficiency. Reformers, however, denounced him as representative of the evils of big business. His daughter Abigail married American financer John Davison Rockefeller Jr. who was the son of Standard Oil co-founder John D. Rockefeller. His descendants, including namesake Nelson A. Rockefeller, became powerful figures in American politics and banking.

Family background
Aldrich was born in Foster, Rhode Island, into a middle-class family purportedly descended from noted English immigrants John Winthrop, William Wickenden, and Roger Williams. His branch passed through generations of declining circumstances. His father was Anan E. Aldrich, a mill hand, and mother Abby Burgess. He attended public schools in East Killingly, Connecticut and the East Greenwich Academy, a boarding school in Rhode Island.

Early career

Aldrich's first job was clerking for the largest wholesale grocer in the state, where he worked his way up to become a partner in the firm.

He served briefly in the Union Army during the American Civil War when he enlisted as a private in Company D of the 10th Rhode Island Infantry on May 26, 1862. Aldrich's company served for three months at Fort DeRussy, which was part of the defenses of Washington, D.C. Aldrich was mustered out of service with the regiment on September 1, 1862.

On October 9, 1866, he married Abigail Pearce Truman "Abby" Chapman, a wealthy woman with impressive antecedents. They had a total of eleven children.

Aldrich began to debate at the local public lecture hall on various political issues of the era. In 1872, after the loss of a child and in the midst of health issues, Aldrich took a five-month tour of Europe and renewed his life's ambition. Aldrich became involved with politics and with the help of local business people in Providence, Aldrich also became a director of a small bank.

Early political career
By 1877, Nelson had a major effect on state politics, even before his election to the United States Congress. He served as a member of the Providence City Council from 1869 to 1875 and as its president in 1872 and 1873, he then was elected as a Republican to the Rhode Island House of Representatives, from 1875 to 1876, and served as Speaker of the House in 1876.

U.S. Senate
In 1878 the Republican bosses of Rhode Island endorsed him for the U.S. House of Representatives; he won and served one term, 1879 to 1881.  In 1881 he was elected to the U.S. Senate by the Rhode Island legislature.  He served in the Senate for 30 years from 1881 to 1911.  He was the longest-serving United States Senator from Rhode Island before the 36-year tenure of Claiborne Pell in the late 20th century.

His long tenure in the Senate was assisted by Rhode Island's restriction of the office to property owners and native-born citizens willing to pay a poll tax, and later, by a legislature that gerrymandered in favor of small Republican towns. Aldrich occupied himself with national tariff issues when arriving in the Senate, and supported the tariff as vital to business owners and ordinary citizens alike. Alrich actively sought out the opinion of business leaders and became friendly with the Sugar Trust. Aldrich sometimes even secured the tariff rate to the amount that Theodore Havemeyer, a Sugar Trust member, requested.

By the 1890s, he was one of the "Big Four" key Republicans who largely controlled the major decisions of the Senate, along with Orville H. Platt of Connecticut, William B. Allison of Iowa and John Coit Spooner of Wisconsin. Aldrich's main power base was his chairmanship of the Senate Finance Committee which oversaw bank regulation and monetary policy. In the early 1890s, Aldrich was considering leaving the Senate, however, a businessman from Rhode Island, Marsden J. Perry, convinced him to stay by making Aldrich a partner in a plan to consolidate and electrify the state's trolley systems. Aldrich soon became a millionaire. Aldrich was opposed to backing currency with silver and was involved with convincing McKinley to run on a gold platform in 1896.

In 1906 Aldrich sold his interest in the Rhode Island street railway system to the New York, New Haven and Hartford Railroad, whose president, Charles Sanger Mellen, was Wall Street banker J. P. Morgan's loyal ally.

National finance

In his subsequent career in the senate he was prominent in the discussion of the great financial questions that arose in Congress.

The panic of 1907 led to the passage of the Aldrich–Vreeland Act in 1908, which established the National Monetary Commission, sponsored and headed by Aldrich. After issuing a series of 30 reports, this commission drew up the Aldrich Plan, forming the basis for the Federal Reserve system.

As co-author of the Payne–Aldrich Tariff Act of 1909, Aldrich removed restrictive import duties on fine art, which enabled Americans to bring in very expensive European artworks that became the foundation of many leading museums.

In 1909, Aldrich introduced a constitutional amendment to establish an income tax, although he had declared a similar measure "communistic" a decade earlier. Aldrich was quite candid about his scheme to block the House bill that had been passed, declaring to the Senate: "I shall vote for the corporation tax as a means to defeat the income tax."

The compromise passed unanimously in the Senate and by a vote of 318 to 14 in the House. The corporate excise tax would be levied, and the income-tax constitutional amendment would be sent out to the states for ratification—which Taft and Aldrich thought was impossible.

Aldrich also served as chairman of the Senate Republican Conference. During his Senate tenure he chaired the committees on Finance, Transportation Routes to the Seaboard, Rules, and the Select Committee on Corporations Organized in the District of Columbia.

Federal Reserve Act
Following the Panic of 1907, Aldrich took control as chairman of the Congressionally established National Monetary Commission.  A proponent of Progressive Era themes of Efficiency and scientific expertise, he led a team of experts to study the European national banks. After his trip, he came to believe that Britain, Germany and France had much superior central banking systems. He worked with several key bankers and economists, including Paul Warburg, Abram Andrew, Frank A. Vanderlip, and Henry Davison, to design a plan for an American central bank in 1911. This work included a trip to Jekyll Island in 1910 to finalize the details of the federal reserve banking plan. In 1913 Woodrow Wilson signed into law the Federal Reserve Act patterned after Aldrich's vision, creating the modern Federal Reserve System.

Foreign affairs
Aldrich opposed entry into the Spanish–American War, but supported McKinley when it began. He played a central role in winning two-thirds Senate approval of the Treaty of Paris that ended the war, and included annexation of the Philippines. He helped frame the Platt Amendment of 1901, which defined the American role in Cuba. He supported the Panama Canal, but was critical of Roosevelt's general Caribbean policy.

In 1906 Aldrich and other American financiers invested heavily in mines and rubber in the Belgian Congo. They supported Belgium's King Leopold II, who had imposed very harsh labor conditions in the colony.

Family prominence

His daughter Abigail Greene "Abby" Aldrich was a philanthropist who married American financer and philanthropist John Davison Rockefeller, Jr. who was the only son of Standard Oil co-founder John D. Rockefeller. Their second son Nelson Aldrich Rockefeller was a four-term Governor of New York who campaigned for the Republican presidential nomination in 1960, 1964, and 1968, and was named Vice President of the United States under President Gerald Ford by the Congress in 1974. Aldrich's son Richard S. Aldrich served in Congress from 1923 to 1933, and his son Winthrop Williams Aldrich served as chairman of the Chase National Bank. His grandson David Rockefeller would eventually become the chairman and would become a leading banker. American film director, writer, and producer Robert Aldrich was his grandson.

Interests

Aldrich was very active in the Freemasons and was Treasurer of the Grand Lodge of Rhode Island.

He developed an elaborate country estate in the Warwick Neck section of Warwick, Rhode Island. The estate is now known as the Aldrich Mansion and is owned by the Roman Catholic Diocese of Rhode Island.

Death and burial
He died on April 16, 1915, in New York City, and was buried in Swan Point Cemetery in Providence, Rhode Island.

Legacy
The Nelson W. Aldrich House on 110 Benevolent Street in Providence serves as the headquarters for the Rhode Island Historical Society.

The Aldrich Middle School in Warwick, Rhode Island is named in his honor.

Aldrich Residence Hall at The University of Rhode Island in Kingston, R.I. is named in his honor.

Aldrich Hall at Harvard Business School in Boston, MA was made possible through a gift from John D. Rockefeller and is named in honor of his father-in-law, Nelson W. Aldrich.

Congressional committee assignments

References

Attribution

Further reading
 Aldrich, Nelson W. Jr., Old Money: The Mythology of America's Upper Class, Alfred A. Knopf, Inc. 1988. Justification by a descendant.
 Gould, Lewis. The Most Exclusive Club: A History of the Modern United States Senate (2009) pp 17–31
 Kert, Bernice. Abby Aldrich Rockefeller: The Woman in the Family. New York: Random House, 1993.
 Phillips, David Graham,  "The Treason of the Senate: Aldrich, The Head of It All," Cosmopolitan, March 1906. online, by a muckraker
 Steffens, Lincoln, "Rhode Island: A State For Sale", McClure's Magazine, February 1904, 337–353, by a muckraker
 Rosmond, James Anthony.  "Nelson Aldrich, Theodore Roosevelt and the Tariff: A Study to 1905." (PhD dissertation, University of North Carolina at Chapel Hill; ProQuest Dissertations Publishing,  1974. 7426929).
 Stephenson, Nathaniel W. Nelson W. Aldrich: A Leader In American Politics. 1930. Scholarly biography online
 Sternstein, Jerome L. "Aldrich, Nelson Wilmarth." in John A. Garraty, ed. Encyclopedia of American Biography (1974) pp 25–27
 Sternstein, Jerome L. "Corruption in the Gilded Age Senate: Nelson W. Aldrich and the Sugar Trust," Capitol Studies 6 (Spring 1978): pp. 13–37.  online
 Sternstein, Jerome L. "King Leopold II, Senator Nelson W. Aldrich, and the Strange Beginnings of American Economic Penetration of the Congo," African Historical Studies in JSTOR
 Weisman, Steven R. The Great Tax Wars: Lincoln to Wilson-The Fierce Battles over Money That Transformed the Nation (Simon & Schuster, 2002). online
 Wicker, Elmus. The Great Debate on Banking Reform: Nelson Aldrich and the Origins of the Fed'', Ohio State University Press, 2005. online

External links

 
 
 Nelson W. Aldrich Papers from the Library of Congress available on FRASER – includes documents relating to the National Monetary Commission

1841 births
1915 deaths
19th-century American politicians
American Freemasons
American people of English descent
Burials at Swan Point Cemetery
Republican Party members of the Rhode Island House of Representatives
National Monetary Commission
People from Foster, Rhode Island
People of Rhode Island in the American Civil War
Providence City Council members
Republican Party members of the United States House of Representatives from Rhode Island
Republican Party United States senators from Rhode Island
Speakers of the Rhode Island House of Representatives
Union Army soldiers
Winthrop family